The Albatros G.II, (Company post-war designation L.11), was a twin-engined German biplane bomber of World War I.

Development
Designed as a medium bomber, the G.II did not share any attributes with the larger G.I, being a single bay biplane with thick section upper wings and rigid X member inter-plane struts. The graceful lines of the fuselage were spoilt by the twin nose-wheel assembly, intended to reduce damage on nose-overs and at rest with a forward centre of gravity. A conventional tail-unit terminated the rear fuselage. The engines were installed in pusher nacelles, supported by struts from the fuselage and the lower wing trailing edges had cut-outs to allow the engines to be mounted further forward than otherwise possible. Only a single prototype was built which demonstrated a relatively poor performance so further development was concentrated on the more powerful Albatros G.III.

Operators

Luftstreitkräfte

Specifications (G.II)

See also

References

Notes

Bibliography

G.II
1910s German bomber aircraft
Aircraft first flown in 1916